

The Miller WM-2 was a single-seat sport aircraft designed in the United States in the early 1970s and marketed for home building. Although primarily a powered aircraft, the WM-2's high aspect-ratio wings enabled the pilot to stop the engine and soar on thermals as with a sailplane (designer W. Terry Miller's previous projects had been sailplanes).

It was a generally conventional, low-wing cantilever monoplane with a cockpit enclosed by a bubble canopy. The undercarriage, however, was a manually retractable monowheel with a tailskid behind it. The fuselage was of wooden construction, covered in plywood and fibreglass, while the wings and tail were built of wood and covered in fabric.

Specifications (prototype)

Notes

References
 
 

1970s United States sport aircraft
Homebuilt aircraft
Low-wing aircraft
Single-engined tractor aircraft
Aircraft first flown in 1972